t Zand is a hamlet in the Dutch province of North Brabant. It is located in the municipality of Altena, on the southeastern edge of the village of Sleeuwijk.

't Zand is not a statistical entity, and the postal authorities have placed it under Sleeuwijk. It consists of about 40 houses.

It was first mentioned in 1980 as 't Zand, and means sand.

References

Populated places in North Brabant
Geography of Altena, North Brabant